Katy Simpson Smith (born 1985) is an American novelist based in New Orleans. She is a member of the core faculty at the Bennington Writing Seminars.

Education and research 

Smith attended public schools in her hometown of Jackson, Mississippi, before earning a B.A. in History and Film Studies from Mt. Holyoke College in Massachusetts. After receiving a Ph.D. in History from the University of North Carolina, Chapel Hill, she went to Bennington College Writing Seminars for her M.F.A. in Creative Writing. 

Her first book, We Have Raised All of You: Motherhood in the South, 1750-1835, a cross-cultural study of motherhood among Southern whites, Indians, and African-Americans in Virginia and the Carolinas, was published in 2013 by Louisiana State University Press. According to the Journal of American History, "Smith has made a valuable contribution to gender and southern studies by effectively complicating and humanizing the concept of motherhood. ... Her text will join the ranks of the few others that tackle this universal and timeless subject."

Literary career 

Smith's first novel, The Story of Land and Sea (HarperCollins, 2014) is set in Beaufort, North Carolina, at the end of the American Revolution. The New York Times wrote that "Smith's spare, rhythmic prose captivates," and according to The Philadelphia Inquirer, "Smith has written something wondrous and rare in her coruscating debut novel…In quiet, powerful language, The Story of Land and Sea takes us to a South that has been forgotten, blotted out by the stain of war, and breathes life into early history." BBC listed it among the "10 Best New Books to Read," and Huffington Post and Vogue Magazine included it as one of their "Best Books of the Year."

The Library Journal wrote about her second novel, Free Men (HarperCollins, 2016), "If [The Story of Land and Sea] could be described as a beautiful murmur, this book is a shout, sharply written and more urgent." In his review in The Washington Post, Ron Charles observed, "With this collage of experiences twisted together and soaked in blood, Smith cuts to the bone of our national character."

Her third novel, The Everlasting, was included by The New York Times in its list of the ten best historical fiction of 2020.

The Weeds, appearing April 18, 2023, will be published by FSG. The starred review in Kirkus calls it “Luminous . . . A lyrical meditation on power, need, and love.”

Smith's writing has also appeared in The Paris Review, Los Angeles Review of Books, The Oxford American, Granta, Literary Hub, Garden & Gun, and Lenny. She has received fellowships and residencies at the MacDowell Colony (2019), the Dora Maar House in Ménerbes (2021), the Santa Maddalena Foundation in Tuscany (2022), and the Monastery of St. Gertrude in Idaho (2022), and also the Richard Wright Award for Literary Excellence (2023).

Bibliography

Novels
 The Story of Land and Sea, Harper Collins, 2014
 Free Men, Harper Collins, 2016
 The Everlasting, Harper Collins, 2020
 The Weeds, Farrar, Straus and Giroux, 2023

Non-fiction
 We Have Raised All of You: Motherhood in the South, 1750-1835, LSU Press, 2013

References

External links
 
 
 
 
 

Living people
American women novelists
21st-century American novelists
University of North Carolina at Chapel Hill alumni
1985 births
Writers from New Orleans
21st-century American women writers
Novelists from Louisiana
Date of birth missing (living people)
Writers from Jackson, Mississippi
Mount Holyoke College alumni
Bennington College alumni